Pachai Kodi is a 1990 Indian Tamil-language film, directed by Manoj Kumar and produced by A. R. Santhilal Nahar. The film stars Pandiarajan, Nirosha, Janagaraj and Major Sundarrajan. It was released on 14 January 1990.

Plot

Cast
Pandiarajan
Nirosha
Janagaraj
Major Sundarrajan

Soundtrack 
The soundtrack was composed by Gangai Amaran.

Reception
P. S. S. of Kalki praised the film's humour.

References

External links
 

1990 films
1990s Tamil-language films
Films scored by Gangai Amaran